Veronicastrum sibiricum, the Sibirian veronicastrum, is a plant in the plantain family Plantaginaceae.

Description 
Veronicastrum sibiricum is a herbaceous plant with whorled, simple leaves, on weakly upright stems. The flowers are pale purple, borne in summer.

Veronicastroside, a flavone, can be found in Veronicastrum sibiricum var. japonicum.

References 

Plantaginaceae
Plants described in 1935